Tegostoma ruptilineale is a moth in the family Crambidae. It was described by Zerney in 1914. It is found in Armenia.

References

Odontiini
Moths described in 1914
Moths of Europe
Moths of Asia
Endemic fauna of Armenia